Kadıoğlu is a village in the Düzce District, Düzce Province, Turkey. Its population is 378 (2022).

References

Villages in Düzce District